Bacchisa pallens is a species of beetle in the family Cerambycidae. It was described by S.-H. Chen in 1936. It is known from China.

References

P
Beetles described in 1936